The Priest and the Girl (German: Der Priester und das Mädchen) is a 1958 Austrian drama film directed by Gustav Ucicky and starring Rudolf Prack, Willy Birgel and Marianne Hold.

The film's sets were designed by the art directors Isabella Schlichting and Werner Schlichting.

Cast
Rudolf Prack as Walter Hartwig 
Willy Birgel as von Gronau 
Marianne Hold as Eva 
Rudolf Lenz as Stefan von Steinegg 
Winnie Markus as Herta 
Hans Thimig as Legation councilor Düringer 
Rolf Wanka as Fiori 
Ewald Balser as Bischof 
Friedl Czepa as Marie 
Hugo Gottschlich as Kilian 
Rosl Dorena as Frl. Weidlich 
Marianne Gerzner as Mrs. Übel 
Mario Kranz as Mr. Kurz 
Elisabeth Stiepl as Mrs. Kurz 
Karl Ehmann as Dr. Lederbauer

References

External links

Austrian drama films
1958 drama films
Films directed by Gustav Ucicky
Films about Catholic priests
Films about paraplegics or quadriplegics
Gloria Film films